The Diocese of Ravello e Scala (Latin: Dioecesis Ravellensis et Scalensis) was a Roman Catholic diocese located in the town of Ravello on the Amalfi Coast in the province of Salerno, Campania, southern Italy. In 1818, it was suppressed.

Ordinaries

Diocese of Ravello
Erected: 1086
Latin Name: Ravellensis

Benedetto de Pradosso (16 Feb 1418 – 1432 Died)
...
Bernardino de Soria, O.F.M. (23 Feb 1529 – 2 Jun 1536 Appointed, Bishop of Venafro)
...
Lodovico Beccadelli (Lodovico Beccatelli) (27 May 1549 – 19 Sep 1555 Appointed, Archbishop of Dubrovnik)
Ercole Tambosi (19 Sep 1555 – 1570 Died)
Paolo Fusco (25 Sep 1570 – 17 Feb 1578 Appointed, Bishop of Sarno)
Emilio Scataratica (17 Mar 1578 – 11 Nov 1590 Died)
Paolo De Curtis, C.R. (26 Apr 1591 – 15 Mar 1600 Appointed, Bishop of Isernia)
Antonio de Franchis, C.R. (31 Jul 1600 – 1603 Resigned)

Diocese of Ravello e Scala
United: 31 July 1603 with the Diocese of Scala

Francesco Bennio de Butrio, O.S.M. (30 Jul 1603 – 19 Jan 1617 Died)
Michele Bonzi, O.F.M. (13 Mar 1617 – 1623 Died)
Onorio de Verme (Honuphrius a Verme) (29 Jul 1624 – 1637 Died)
Celestino Puccitelli, B. (17 Aug 1637 – 14 Sep 1641 Died)
Bernardino Panicola (15 Dec 1642 – 10 Nov 1666 Died)
Giuseppe Saggese (16 Mar 1667 – 18 Feb 1694 Died)
Luigi Capuani (Ludovico Capulani) (15 Mar 1694 – 14 Dec 1705 Appointed, Bishop of Gravina di Puglia)
Nicolò Rocco (22 Feb 1706 – 21 Feb 1707 Appointed, Bishop of Cassano all'Jonio)
Giuseppe Maria Perrimezzi, O.M. (11 Apr 1707 – 26 Feb 1714 Appointed, Bishop of Oppido Mamertina)
Nicola Guerriero (6 Apr 1718 – 30 Apr 1732 Died)
Antonio Maria Santoro, O.M. (9 Jun 1732 – 10 May 1741 Died)
Biagio Chiarelli (26 Nov 1742 – 31 May 1765 Died)
Michele Tafuri (5 Aug 1765 – 1 Jun 1778 Appointed, Bishop of Cava de' Tirreni)
Nicola Molinari, O.F.M. Cap. (1 Jun 1778 – 15 Dec 1783 Appointed, Bishop of Bovino)
Silvestro (Jean Baptiste) Miccù, O.F.M. Obs. (27 Feb 1792 Confirmed – 29 Oct 1804 Appointed, Archbishop of Amalfi)

Suppressed: 1818

References

Former Roman Catholic dioceses in Italy
Ravello
Province of Salerno